Zaman Al'ar  was a Syrian television series that aired during the Ramadan season of 2009, created by the writer Hassan Sami Yusuf and directed by Rasha Shurbatji. The series discussed the concept of shame and honor in Arab societies, specifically the middle class and the toiling and link this concept of women and virginity.

Plot 
The series revolves around a female character, a girl over the age of thirty, who has dedicated her youth to serving her mother with chronic illness, who was kept in bed for 11 years, which caused her isolation from the outside world and deprived her of her femininity and the fulfillment of her dreams as a woman in obtaining a husband, home and family. Suddenly, she finds herself in front of Jamil, the husband of her only friend Sabah, and her outlet to society, who wakes up the feeling of forgotten femininity in her to put her in his net and persuades her to marry him in secret without the knowledge of her family. Bouthina finds herself, who did not know and did not date a man in her life in front of Jamil, who demands her physical right to her, so the forbidden takes place. Buthaina loses her virginity and becomes pregnant to find herself facing a set of values and concepts that criminalize her act.

See also
 List of Syrian television series

References

 

Syrian television series
2009 Syrian television series debuts